KRCO may refer to:

 KRCO (AM), a radio station (690 AM) licensed to serve Prineville, Oregon, United States
 KRCO-FM, a radio station (95.7 FM) licensed to serve Prineville, Oregon